The Men competition at the 2022 World Allround Speed Skating Championships was held on 5 and 6 March 2022.

Results

500 m
The race was started on 5 March at 14:26.

5000 m
The race was started on 5 March at 16:11.

1500 m
The race was started on 6 March at 14:46.

10000 m
The race was started on 6 March at 16:21.

Overall standings
After all races.

References

Men